Ralph Albert Garza Jr. (born April 6, 1994) is an American professional baseball pitcher who is a free agent. He previously played for the Houston Astros, Minnesota Twins and Tampa Bay Rays. He was drafted by the Astros in the 26th round of the 2015 Major League Baseball draft.

Professional career

Houston Astros
Garza was drafted by the Houston Astros in the 26th round, 769th overall, of the 2015 Major League Baseball draft out of the University of Oklahoma. He made his professional debut with the Low-A Tri-City ValleyCats.

Garza split the 2016 season between the Single-A Quad Cities River Bandits and the High-A Lancaster JetHawks, posting a 6–5 record and 3.35 ERA with 64 strikeouts. In 2017, he played for the High-A Buies Creek Astros, the Double-A Corpus Christi Hooks, and the Triple-A Fresno Grizzlies, accumulating a 3–3 record and 4.22 ERA in 36 appearances. He split the 2018 season between Fresno and Corpus Christi, pitching to a 7–2 record and 3.51 ERA in 66.2 innings of work.

He spent 2019 in Triple-A with the Round Rock Express, registering an 8–1 record and 4.04 ERA in 42 appearances. Garza did not play in a game in 2020 due to the cancellation of the minor league season because of the COVID-19 pandemic. He was added to the Astros’ 60-man player pool for the season, but did not appear for the team. He was assigned to the Triple-A Sugar Land Skeeters to begin the 2021 season, and recorded 6.2 scoreless innings across 3 games to begin the year.

On May 26, 2021, the Astros selected Garza for the 40-man roster and promoted to the major leagues for the first time.  Garza made his MLB debut on May 29, pitching in relief in the 12th inning of a game against the San Diego Padres.  In the game, he notched his first major league strikeout, punching out Padres catcher Víctor Caratini, but surrendered a 3-run home run to Wil Myers and was credited with the loss. Garza won his first game as a pitcher on July 11. He was sent to relieve Blake Taylor in the eighth inning with the Astros down 7-2. He pitched the final five outs and allowed zero runs on three strikeouts and walks as the Astros won in the bottom of the ninth inning. 

On August 1, Garza was designated for assignment by the Astros.

Minnesota Twins
On August 4, 2021, Garza was claimed off of waivers by the Minnesota Twins. He was assigned to the Triple-A St. Paul Saints. He made three appearances for St. Paul, allowing three runs in  innings. He was designated for assignment by the Twins on March 22, 2022.

Tampa Bay Rays
On March 24, 2022, Garza was claimed off waivers by the Boston Red Sox.

On April 7, 2022, Garza was claimed off of waivers by the Tampa Bay Rays, after he was designated for assignment by the Red Sox. In 19 games, he posted a 3.34 ERA in 35 innings. He was designated for assignment on August 20. He elected free agency on November 10, 2022.

References

External links

1994 births
Living people
People from Edinburg, Texas
Baseball players from Texas
American expatriate baseball players in Venezuela
Major League Baseball pitchers
Houston Astros players
Minnesota Twins players
Tampa Bay Rays players
Oklahoma Sooners baseball players
Tri-City ValleyCats players
Quad Cities River Bandits players
Lancaster JetHawks players
Buies Creek Astros players
Corpus Christi Hooks players
Fresno Grizzlies players
Caribes de Anzoátegui players
Round Rock Express players
Sultanes de Monterrey players
Sugar Land Skeeters players
St. Paul Saints players